WEL Networks Limited is an electricity distribution company, serving the northern and central Waikato region of New Zealand.  WEL is the fifth largest electricity distribution companies in New Zealand, with over 80,000 connections and 5,226 km of lines.

WEL was formed when Legislation in 1988 amalgamated the Central Waikato Electric Power Board with Hamilton City Council's Electricity Division from 1989 to form Waikato Electricity Limited. After amalgamation, ownership of WEL was vested in the Waikato Electricity Authority (WEA). WEA formed WEL Energy Trust in 1993, with the first election in June, so that the community could have some ownership of WEL. In 1992 a third of WEL was sold to Utilicorp for almost $40m, a third retained for the Trust and a third given to customers. The Electricity Industry Reform Act 1998 forced WEL to sell its retail business. It sold to the State owned (but later bought as NGC by Vector Limited) Natural Gas Corporation for $89.9m. The Trust then bought back all WEL's shares to become its sole owner. In 2001 WEL was renamed WEL Networks Ltd. After the Trust's 2003 elections it reduced grants given to community groups and started paying discounts to customers. By 2014 the Trust had paid over $240 million to customers in discounts, but had also invested over $60 million in community and energy efficiency grants. In 2014–15, over $2m was paid in grants.

WEL Networks formed a joint venture in 2010 with Waipa Networks and Crown Fibre Holdings to establish Ultra-fast Fibre Limited, a company that owns and operates the fibre network in Hamilton, New Plymouth, Tauranga, and Whanganui. In 2016, WEL and Waipa Networks paid $189 million to take 100% control of the Ultra-Fast Fibre company. In 2020, WEL and Waipa Networks sold their interest in Ultra-fast Fibre to Japanese-owned First State Investments for $854 million.

Distribution network
WEL's distribution area covers the Hamilton City and the majority of the Waikato District, including the towns of Ngāruawāhia, Huntly, Te Kauwhata and Raglan. The distribution network is supplied from Transpower's national grid at four grid exit points (GXPs): Hamilton (Ruakura Road), Te Kowhai, Huntly and Meremere. WEL networks uses 33,000 volts for subtransmission and 11,000 volts for distribution. As is standard in New Zealand, electricity is delivered to homes at 230/400 volts (phase-to-neutral/phase-to-phase).

Generation assets
  1 MW Horotiu landfill gas generation (to 2012)
 64 MW Te Uku Wind Farm

Subsidiaries
 Infratec Limited

References

External links
WEL Networks website

Electric power distribution network operators in New Zealand
Telecommunications companies of New Zealand
Waikato
New Zealand companies established in 1989
Energy companies established in 1989